Guy Hill (born 14 December 1959, in Road Town, Tortola) is a former sprinter from the British Virgin Islands.

Hill was part of the first ever team to represent British Virgin Islands at the Summer Olympics when he competed in the 1984 Summer Olympics.  He entered the 100 metres sprint and in his heat he ran a time of 11.11 seconds and finished 6th out of seven runners.  He also entered the 4x400 metres relay and again finished 6th in the heat.

References

1959 births
Living people
British Virgin Islands male sprinters
Athletes (track and field) at the 1984 Summer Olympics
Olympic athletes of the British Virgin Islands